Villarroel is a surname. Notable people with the surname include:

Antoni de Villarroel (1656–1726), Spanish military commander, general commander of the Army of Catalonia in the War of the Spanish Succession
Catherine Villarroel, fashion model and beauty queen from Bolivia
Diego de Torres Villarroel (1693–1770), Spanish writer, poet, dramatist, doctor, mathematician, priest, professor of the University of Salamanca
Gualberto Villarroel (1908–1946), head of state of Bolivia from December 20, 1943, to July 21, 1946
Luis Villarroel (born 1981), Venezuelan diver
Mario Enrique Villarroel Lander (born 1947), Venezuelan lawyer
Moisés Villarroel (born 1976), Chilean football midfielder
Néstor Guzmán Villarroel (born 1964), Bolivian politician and trade unionist
Verónica Villarroel, Chilean soprano

See also
Gualberto Villarroel Province, province in the La Paz Department, Bolivia
Puerto Villarroel, locality in the Cochabamba Department in central Bolivia